Sepahan Novin Football Club is an Iranian professional football  team based in Esfahan, Iran. They are the reserve team of Sepahan F.C. and currently compete in the 2011–12 Iran Football's 3rd Division.

History
The club was founded in 2003, signing talented youth players of Sepahan. They became champion of Isfahan Provincial League and were promoted to 3rd Division. The club was successful each year and were promoted to higher divisions until they reached Azadegan League in 2007. They finished second in their group and qualified for the Iran Pro League playoffs, beating Steel Azin F.C. and earning promotion to the Iran Pro League. According to FIFA rights, a club can't participate in a league with more than one team. Sepahan Officials tried to show that Sepahan Novin was independent from Sepahan and changed the board of directors of Sepahan Novin, but this was not accepted by IRIFF and Foolad F.C. were promoted to the Iran Pro League instead.

In 2010, the license of Sepahan Novin Football Club in Azadegan League was bought by Foolad Natanz.

Although after that, most of the players and the coach moved to Foolad Natanz Football Club, but Sepahan Novin Football Club still survived. In 2010, Sepahan Novin bought the license of one of the teams (Shahrdari Noshahr) in 2010–11 Iran Football's 3rd Division, and they will again compete in Iran Football's 3rd Division.

Season-by-season
The table below chronicles the achievements of Sepahan Novin  in various competitions since 2004.

Club managers
  Hossein Charkhabi (2004–2008)
  Ralf Borges Ferreira (2008–2009)
  Amrollah Soltani (2009–2010)
  Hossein Charkhabi (2010)
  Amrollah Soltani (2010–)

See also
 Hazfi Cup
 Iran Football's 3rd Division 2011–12
 Foolad Natanz F.C.
 Sepahan F.C.

References

External links
 Players and Results

Sepahan S.C.
Football clubs in Iran
2003 establishments in Iran